Pique or piqué may refer to:

Arts and entertainment
 Piqué (ballet), a dance movement
 Pique (play), an 1875 play produced by Augustin Daly 
 "Pique", an episode of Law & Order: Special Victims Unit (season 2)

Ships
 HMS Pique, seven ships of the Royal Navy
 USS PC-1249, a US Navy submarine chaser sold to France as Pique (W13)

People
 Piqué (surname)

Other uses
 Piqué (weaving), a cloth weaving style
Piqué (fabric), woven and knitted fabrics
 Pique (river), Haute-Garonne, southern France
 Tungiasis, a skin parasite known as "pique" in much of South America
 Pique Newsmagazine, a Canadian magazine
 Pique, the 1986 FIFA World Cup mascot
 Piqué, a type of shot in artistic billiards
 Pique (abstract algebra), a quasigroup with an idempotent element
 Pique, the emotion of resentment

See also
 Piqué work, a type of jewelry made from tortoiseshell inlaid with gold or silver
 Piquet (disambiguation)
 Piquer (surname)